Sibu Misra is a Bharatiya Janata Party politician from Assam. He has been elected in Assam Legislative Assembly in 2016 and 2021 from 92 No. Lumding constituency.

Sibu Misra is a social worker from Lumding constituency. He is MLA from BJP.

References 

Living people
Bharatiya Janata Party politicians from Assam
Assam MLAs 2016–2021
Assam MLAs 2021–2026
1969 births